John Andrew Andretti (March 12, 1963January 30, 2020) was an American race car driver. He won individual races in CART, IMSA GTP, Rolex Sports Car Series, and NASCAR during his career. He was the son of Aldo Andretti, older brother of racer Adam Andretti, nephew of Mario Andretti, and first cousin to IndyCar champion Michael and Jeff Andretti.

Early life 
John Andretti was born on March 12, 1963, in Bethlehem, Pennsylvania, to "Corky" and Aldo Andretti. As a member of the famous Andretti racing family he was predestined for a racing career. Starting with karts at a young age, he graduated in time to junior stock cars and USAC midgets.

Andretti graduated from Moravian College with a degree in business management and later reflected he would have been an investment banker or stock broker if he had not started racing.  He started racing actual sports cars in 1984. Andretti joined the BMW North America team for a full IMSA GTP season in 1986. He won that year at Watkins Glen, paired with Davy Jones.

CART
Andretti joined the PPG Indy Car World Series (CART) in 1987. In his debut at the Indianapolis Motor Speedway in 1988, he reached as high as seventh place before mechanical problems forced him to finish 21st. In 1991 he won the only race of his CART career, the Gold Coast Indy 300 in Surfer's Paradise, Australia. He finished a career-best fifth in the 1991 Indianapolis 500. The 1994 Indy 500 was his last appearance in that race until 2007.

IMSA GTP and Rolex Sports Car Series
In 1986 Andretti drove a BMW M12 March, along with co-driver Davy Jones, in the 1986 IMSA GT Championship season. While the BMWs had limited success in IMSA competition, Andretti and Jones won the Kodak Copier 500 at Watkins Glen International on September 21, 1986.

In 1989, Andretti drove the Miller High Life/BF Goodrich Porsche 962 to victory in the Rolex 24 Hours at Daytona (called the Sunbank 24 at Daytona at the time) along with co-drivers Bob Wollek and Derek Bell. Later in the IMSA season, Andretti and Wollek won the Pontiac Grand Prix of Palm Beach, driving the same Porsche 962. Andretti finished fifth in points (112) in the 1989 IMSA season, first among Porsche drivers.

In 2001 Andretti teamed up with Kyle Petty to win the GT Class in the 6-hour sports car race at Watkins Glen.

Andretti returned to the 24 Hours of Daytona in the Rolex Sports Car Series in 2008. Team drivers for the Vision Racing No. 03 Porsche Crawford Prototype included Ed Carpenter, A. J. Foyt IV, and Vítor Meira. The team finished 25th in the race, their first Porsche Crawford Prototype entry in the 24 Hours of Daytona.

NHRA Winston Drag Racing
In 1993, Andretti drove the Taco Bell Express Top Fuel Dragster for owner Jack Clark. In that race he beat 1992 T/F Champion Joe Amato in Round 1 and Mopar Express Lube driver Tommy Johnson Jr. in Round 2, but lost to Mike Dunn in Darrell Gwynn's La Victoria Salsa Car in the semi-finals. That race was won by Eddie Hill.

NASCAR

1993–1999

Andretti made his Winston Cup debut in 1993. He drove the No. 72 Tex Racing Chevy for Tex Powell at North Wilkesboro Speedway, where he started 31st and finished twenty-fourth. After running three more races in 1993, he began the 1994 season driving the No. 14 Financial World-sponsored Chevy for Billy Hagan. On May 29, he became the first driver in history to race in both the Indianapolis 500 and the Coca-Cola 600 on the same day. He finished tenth at Indy and thirty-sixth in the Coca-Cola 600 after suffering mechanical failures. In the middle of the season he switched to the No. 43 STP-sponsored Pontiac for Petty Enterprises. His best finish was eleventh place, at Richmond International Raceway. He ended the season thirty-second in points and fifth in the Rookie of the Year battle.

In 1995, he began driving for Michael Kranefuss in the No. 37 Kmart/Little Caesars-sponsored Ford Thunderbird. He won his first career pole at the Southern 500 and finished in the top ten five times. He ended the season eighteenth in points. During the 1996 season, he switched to the No. 98 RCA-sponsored Ford owned by Cale Yarborough (while Jeremy Mayfield, the previous driver of the No. 98 car, moved to Kranefuss' team). He placed fifth at the Hanes 500 and had two more top-ten finishes. In 1997, he scored his first career win at the Pepsi 400 and finished twenty-third in points. He returned to the No. 43 Petty car in 1998. Although he didn't win any races that season, he did have ten Top 10 finishes and placed a career-best eleventh in points. He won his second career race in 1999 at Martinsville Speedway, where he made up a lost lap and took the lead with four laps to go. He also won the pole at Phoenix International Raceway.

2000–2005
Midway through the 2000 season, Cheerios became Andretti's primary sponsor. This was the precursor to Petty Enterprises' switch to Dodge as their manufacturer, and with the team pulling double duty trying to keep the Pontiacs they were currently racing and prepare the Dodges that were coming in, things began to fall apart for the organization. He fell to twenty-third in points after finishing in the top ten twice. Over the next two seasons, Andretti posted three top ten finishes including a notable second at Bristol where he finished second to Elliott Sadler (this was the last 1-2 finish for Petty Enterprises and Wood Brothers Racing), before he was released midway through the 2003 season. He ran a couple of races for Haas CNC Racing and Richard Childress Racing before finishing the season in the No. 1 Pennzoil-sponsored Chevy for Dale Earnhardt, Inc. His best finish that year was eighth at California.

Andretti started the 2004 season driving the No. 1 part-time for DEI, but departed midway through the season. He ended the year driving the No. 14 Victory Brand-sponsored Ford Taurus for ppc Racing and finished twenty-second at Charlotte Motor Speedway. Andretti started 2005 still driving with ppc, but the team was forced to dissolve due to a lack of funding. He drove four races in the Craftsman Truck Series for Billy Ballew Motorsports, and finished eighth at Memphis Motorsports Park. He also attempted a handful of Cup races for Morgan-McClure Motorsports' No. 4 Lucas Oil-sponsored Chevrolet, finishing twenty-eighth at Michigan International Speedway, one lap down.

2006–2010
In 2006, Andretti returned to ppc to drive their No. 10 Busch Series car. Before the season, his only Busch start came in 1998 at Daytona, where he finished thirteenth in the No. 96 Chevy fielded by the Curb Agajanian Performance Group. Despite having made over three hundred Cup starts with two victories, Andretti applied for and was accepted as a contender for Rookie of the Year. He finished runner-up to Danny O'Quinn for the award.

In 2007, Andretti drove the No. 10 FreedomRoads/Camping World/RVs.com-sponsored Car for Braun Racing at Daytona through their affiliation with ppc Racing. When funding for the team became questionable, Andretti left Braun Racing. The team used various drivers in 2007 in an attempt to maintain a two-car team. Andretti drove four races for Petty Enterprises in the No. 45 car, where he filled in for Kyle Petty, who was working as a broadcaster for Turner Network Television's race coverage. He also briefly drove part-time for Front Row Motorsports. He finished the season in the No. 49 Paralyzed Veterans of America-sponsored Dodge for BAM Racing.

Andretti drove for Front Row Motorsports in 2008, driving the No. 34 Chevrolet Impala SS in the Sprint Cup Series. He raced his way into the 2008 Daytona 500 in the second Gatorade Duel race. He drove in the first ten races of the season in the 34 before leaving to focus on his IndyCar team.

Andretti returned full-time to the 34 in 2009 in a partnership between Front Row and Earnhardt Ganassi Racing. The No. 34 had sponsorships from Window World, myAutoloan.com, and Taco Bell. He did not have a full-time ride for 2010, but drove the No. 34 Front Row Motorsports entry to a 38th-place finish after an accident on lap 117 in the Daytona 500, his final race in NASCAR.

IRL IndyCar Series

In 2007, Andretti returned to the Indianapolis 500 for the first time since 1994 when he pulled the double (competed in the Indy 500 and the Coca-Cola 600 in the same day). He drove the third entry from Panther Racing, with Camping World as the sponsor. He started in 24th on the eighth row, but crashed on lap 95 and finished 30th.

In 2008 Andretti replaced Jay Howard in the Roth Racing No. 24 Dallara-Honda. This placed him 21st on the grid; he finished on the lead lap in 16th place. Andretti continued in the No. 24 car in the Milwaukee Mile and Texas Motor Speedway races, and on June 6 he was offered a deal that would keep him in the car the rest of the season. He did not accept.

Andretti's run with Roth Racing produced some notable results for the team. He qualified 7th at the Texas Motor Speedway race.  Although he had a great start, he finished 16th.  He began the race at Iowa Speedway with a rough 23rd position start, but steadily worked his way through the field to capture an 11th-place finish, the best for a Roth Racing machine. His final start for the team was at Richmond International Raceway the next week, where he was knocked out by a crash. Roth Racing contracted to a single car for the rest of the season and then ceased operations. Andretti finished 30th in the 2008 IndyCar points standings.

In April 2009 Andretti and Richard Petty announced a joint venture with Dreyer & Reinbold Racing, whereby Andretti would return to Indianapolis to drive the No. 43 car in the 93rd Indianapolis 500. As in his previous two trips to Indianapolis, Andretti did not race the Indy/Charlotte double, and also missed the Southern 500 and the Coca-Cola 600 to prepare for the race. Andretti qualified for the race on bump day in 28th, and finished in 19th place, the final car on the lead lap. Andretti returned to drive the No. 34 at Front Row Motorsports immediately after the Indianapolis 500, and returned for the Dover 400 in June.

On March 31, 2010, Andretti announced that he would join forces with Richard Petty and Window World for two events. The No. 43 returned as the entry, which was backed by Andretti Autosport, owned by John's cousin Michael. The team's first race was the RoadRunner Turbo Indy 300 at Kansas Speedway on May 1. Andretti qualified 15th but finished 9th, one lap down. The team also competed in the 94th Indianapolis 500 on May 30. After failing to qualify on pole day, Andretti made the race on bump day qualifying 28th for the second consecutive year. Andretti crashed out of the race on lap 65, and was credited with a 30th-place finish.

Andretti ran in the centennial Indianapolis 500, partnered with Window World, Petty, and Andretti Autosport. He finished 22nd.

Personal life, illness and death

Andretti was active in the Central Indiana community. Each year during the Brickyard 400 week, he worked up with 93.1 WIBC, and Dave "The King" Wilson, and General Mills to hold the Race for Riley, benefiting James Whitcomb Riley Hospital for Children.

From 2007, Andretti was a co-host of The Driver's Seat with John Kernan on Sirius Satellite Radio's NASCAR channel 90.

Andretti's son, Jarett, was a USAC sprint car driver and later a driver in the GT4 America Series.

In April 2017, Andretti disclosed that he had stage four colon cancer. His cancer battle, originally misdiagnosed as Stage III-A cancer, was widely publicized, with him starting a Twitter hashtag called #CheckIt4Andretti, promoting getting a colonoscopy. After months of chemotherapy, Andretti was deemed cancer-free in late 2017. However, in May 2018, he suffered a relapse of the cancer, which metastasized even further. He went through another round of chemotherapy for the rest of the year, which ended in January 2019. The cancer relapsed again in late March 2019. Andretti died of colon cancer on January 30, 2020, at aged 56.

After his death, #CheckIt4Andretti became a foundation to provide colonoscopies for those without insurance. In 2021, Andretti Motorsports announced a partnership with Jarrett and Unite Health Share Ministries for the "Steer Clear of Cancer" campaign, to raise donations for the foundation during Colon Cancer Awareness Month.

Motorsports career results

American open–wheel racing results
(key) (Races in bold indicate pole position)

PPG Indycar Series

IndyCar Series

 1 Run on same day.
 2 Non-points-paying, exhibition race.
 3 The Las Vegas Indy 300 was abandoned after Dan Wheldon died from injuries sustained in a 15-car crash on lap 11.

Indianapolis 500 results

Complete Bathurst 1000 results

24 Hours of Le Mans

NASCAR
(key) (Bold – Pole position awarded by qualifying time. Italics – Pole position earned by points standings or practice time. * – Most laps led.)

Sprint Cup Series

Daytona 500

Busch Series

Camping World Truck Series

References

External links

 The Official Andretti Family Website
 
 John Andretti at IndyCar
 John Andretti at Daytona 500 Racing
 NASCAR drivers statistics at racing-reference.info
 John Andretti Fan Page
 John's window to Indy 2009

1963 births
2020 deaths
Deaths from colorectal cancer
Sportspeople from Bethlehem, Pennsylvania
Racing drivers from Pennsylvania
Military personnel from Pennsylvania
Indianapolis 500 drivers
24 Hours of Le Mans drivers
24 Hours of Daytona drivers
NASCAR drivers
IndyCar Series drivers
Champ Car drivers
Rolex Sports Car Series drivers
Dragster drivers
John Andrew
Moravian University alumni
World Sportscar Championship drivers
American people of Italian descent
Deaths from cancer in North Carolina
Dale Earnhardt Inc. drivers
Richard Childress Racing drivers
Stewart-Haas Racing drivers
USAC Silver Crown Series drivers
Porsche Motorsports drivers
A. J. Foyt Enterprises drivers
Panther Racing drivers
Dreyer & Reinbold Racing drivers
Andretti Autosport drivers
Garry Rogers Motorsport drivers
BMW M drivers
Jaguar Racing drivers
Vision Racing drivers